Gerald Cassidy may refer to:
 Gerald Cassidy (lobbyist)
 Gerald Cassidy (artist)

See also
 Gerard Cassidy, member of the Massachusetts House of Representatives